Parent article: List of tornadoes and tornado outbreaks

These are some notable tornadoes, tornado outbreaks, and tornado outbreak sequences that have occurred in Asia, including the Arabian Peninsula.

Bangladesh

China

India

Indonesia

Japan

Malaysia

Myanmar

Nepal

Pakistan

Philippines

Sri Lanka

Vietnam

See also 
 List of tornadoes and tornado outbreaks
 List of European tornadoes and tornado outbreaks
 Tornado records
 tornadic waterspout

References

External links 
 Tornadoes of Bangladesh and eastern India by Jonathon D. Finch, M.S. (with additional global tornado information)
 Tornadoes of Asia
 Waterspouts spotted off Chinese coast – video by The Guardian
 
 

Tornadoes and tornado outbreaks
Tornado-related lists